The Bachelors are an Irish music group formed in 1957.

The Bachelors may also refer to:

 The Bachelors (novel), a 1960 novel by Muriel Spark
 The Bachelors (1953 film), a Mexican musical comedy film
 The Bachelors (2017 film), an American comedy-drama film
 The Bachelors (Australian season 10), the tenth season of reality television series The Bachelor Australia
 It's a Great Life (TV series), a 1950s American sitcom that aired in syndication as The Bachelors
 Bobby Taylor & the Vancouvers, a Canadian soul band originally known as Little Daddy and the Bachelors

See also
 Bachelor (disambiguation)
 Batchelors, a soup company